Kanishka (c. AD 127–163) was the emperor of the Kushan dynasty. Kanishka,  Kaniska or Kaniška may also refer to
Kanishka casket, a Buddhist reliquary dated to the first year of the reign of Kanishka
Kanishka stupa, established during the 2nd century CE near Peshawar, Pakistan
Air India Flight 182, named after Emperor Kanishka
Kaniška Iva, a village in Croatia
Kaniska canace (blue admiral), a nymphalid butterfly
Pseudochazara kanishka, a nymphalid butterfly
Kanishka (name)